Cranbrook is a new town being developed in East Devon, England, as of the March 2021 census, its population was 6,741 residents across 8 phases however, the town is growing at a fast pace. It is located 9 kilometres (5.6 mi) east-north-east of the centre of Exeter, just north-west of the village of Rockbeare, between the B3174 road (London Road and former A30) and the West of England Main Line railway. The civil parish was formed on 1 April 2015.

The ideas and requirements to construct houses in the area were first proposed in 1995 and appeared in both the Devon 2001-2016 Structure Plan and the East Devon Local Plan 1995-2001.  The first houses were occupied as St Martin's C of E Primary school was completed in 2012 and at least 500 houses had been occupied by December 2013. Cranbrook's population was estimated at 2,200, with nearly 1,000 homes occupied. As of March 2021, the Cranbrook Parish had rapidly grown to a population of 6,743. Some of the town's main house builder's include - but are not limited to- Persimmon Homes, Bovis, Redrow, Linden, Charles Church and Taylor Wimpey.

In September 2018 Cranbrook hosted the start of Stage 2 of the OVO Energy Tour of Britain cycle race. A permanent indicator of this event can be found at Younghayes Road, in front of the St Martin's C of E primary school as well as the Neighbourhood Centre. It features a representation of a bike in yellow coating displaying some text.

Accessibility and transport 
Cranbrook railway station on the Exeter - Waterloo line opened in 2015. The project cost over £5 million, and provides an hourly service to Exeter and London Waterloo.

Stagecoach South West operate three bus routes serving the town: the 4 between Exeter, Cranbrook, Ottery St Mary, Honiton and Axminster; the 4A between Exeter, Cranbrook, West Hill, Ottery St Mary and Honiton; and the 4B which is an early morning bus which goes to Exeter, Cranbrook, West Hill, Ottery St Mary, Honiton and Axminster.  On Sundays the only service to run is the 4 as a reduced service from Exeter to Cranbrook.

In the 2010's, the Clyst Honiton Bypass was created specifically to accommodate the new town. It connects Honiton Road to the A30 and M5 (Junction 29) Both of which experienced improvements.

Facilities 
The first phase of the Cranbrook development is known as "Younghayes". A primary school (St Martin's C of E) opened in September 2012. The Younghayes Centre is complete and is used as a meeting point for clubs, meetings and events. It houses a Youth Club. There is also a neighbourhood centre with a general shop and a pharmacy.

The second phase includes a second primary school and a secondary school as part of the all-through Cranbrook Education Campus, as well as a town centre. Promises were given in late 2021 by East Devon District Council that an agreement had been reached for a Morrisons supermarket to be built south of the Cranberry Farm pub, to be open in September 2023. As of 3 January 2023, construction work has begun on the town centre.

Developers Redrow Homes are consulting with the local authority to build a further 1035 new homes. Other developers such as Persimmon Homes, Linden, Bovis and Taylor Wimpey are constructing homes close to the Cranbrook Education Campus.

The Country Park was a conservationist policy implemented in the town, it provides an area of green space and trees for socialising, sports etc. A landscaping business won a secondary trade award for the category "Grounds Maintenance - Free Public Access" in 2022.

References

External links

Cranbrook Town Council
Cranbrook Town Centre
East Devon District Council's New Community pages

Towns in Devon
New towns in England
East Devon District
New towns started in the 2010s